Arati Das (1944 – 6 February 2020), known professionally as Miss Shefali, was an Indian Bengali actress and dancer who was recognized for her work in Bengali cinema. She had worked with film director Satyajit Ray in classics like Pratidwandi and Seemabaddha. She is known as the Queen of Cabaret.

Early life and background  
Arati Das was the youngest of three sisters from a Bengali Hindu family of Narayanganj, East Bengal (now in Bangladesh) which migrated to India during the Partition of Bengal. She started performing cabaret at the age of 11 at Firpo's hotel and later in the Grand Hotel to earn for her family and then there was no looking back.

Career

Arati Das had made her film debut in Bengali film named Chowringhee, in which she acts with actors like Supriya Devi, Uttam Kumar, Utpal Dutt, and Biswajit. Besides films, she also acted in several stage plays and theater. Her plays include Samrat O Sundari, Saheb Bibi Golam, and Ashlil. She was also a writer. Her autobiography Sandhya Rater Shefali (Shefali of the Evenings and Nights) was published recently.

Personal life

An American National named Robin once wanted to marry her but for her family she decided to stay in India as unmarried.

Selected filmography

References

External links

 

Indian female dancers
1944 births
2020 deaths
Actresses in Bengali cinema
20th-century Indian actresses